Paul Fenton (born 4 July 1946 in Huddersfield, Yorkshire, England) is an English drummer, best known for his work with T. Rex. After leaving Christie, he started playing drums for T. Rex in 1973, after being recommended to Marc Bolan by his producer Tony Visconti.  He also toured briefly with Marc Bolan & T. Rex in 1974, and played additional drums with Davy Lutton on the songs "Solid Baby", "Funky London Childhood", and "Visions Of Domino".

Fenton also played in Carmen, a progressive rock band with a flamenco focus.  The band released three albums between 1973 and 1975.

Fenton along with Mickey Finn, formed a T. Rex tribute band in 1997, named Mickey Finn's T-Rex. After the death of Finn in 2003, Fenton continued to play drums for the band, which now performs named more simply as T-Rex. In 2008, a petition signed by the likes of David Bowie, Roy Wood and Tony Visconti called for Paul Fenton to change the band's name in order to make it clear that it was a tribute act, not the actual T. Rex.

Discography

With Christie
 1971 – For All Mankind
 2012 – No Turn Unstoned

With Carmen
 1973 – Fandangos in Space
 1975 – Dancing on a Cold Wind
 1976 – Gypsies

With T. Rex
 1974 – Additional drums on the song "Solid Baby", which featured on the albums Light of Love and Bolan's Zip Gun

With Mickey Finn's T-Rex
 2002 – Renaissance
 2008 – Back in Business 
 2009 – Classic Hits

References

1946 births
Living people
English rock drummers
Musicians from Huddersfield
T. Rex (band) members